Sinechostictus is a genus of ground beetles in the family Carabidae. There are more than 30 described species in Sinechostictus.

Species
These 32 species belong to the genus Sinechostictus:
 Sinechostictus afghanistanus (Jedlicka, 1968)  (temperate Asia)
 Sinechostictus alesmetana (Toledano, 2008)  (China)
 Sinechostictus arnosti (Nakane, 1978)  (temperate Asia)
 Sinechostictus barbarus (G.Müller, 1918)  (Africa)
 Sinechostictus cameroni (Andrewes, 1922)  (Asia)
 Sinechostictus chuji (Jedlicka, 1951)  (temperate Asia)
 Sinechostictus cribrum (Jacquelin du Val, 1852)  (Africa and Europe)
 Sinechostictus cyprius (De Monte, 1949)  (temperate Asia)
 Sinechostictus dahlii (Dejean, 1831)  (Africa and Europe)
 Sinechostictus decoratus (Duftschmid, 1812)  (Europe)
 Sinechostictus doderoi (Ganglbauer, 1891)  (Europe)
 Sinechostictus elongatus (Dejean, 1831)  (Europe)
 Sinechostictus emeishanicus Toledano, 2008  (China)
 Sinechostictus exaratus (Andrewes, 1924)  (Asia)
 Sinechostictus frederici (G.Müller, 1918)  (Africa and Europe)
 Sinechostictus galloisi (Netolitzky, 1938)  (temperate Asia)
 Sinechostictus inustus (Jacquelin du Val, 1857)  (Europe)
 Sinechostictus kosti (Matits, 1912)  ((former) Yugoslavia)
 Sinechostictus kyushuensis (Habu, 1957)  (Japan)
 Sinechostictus lederi (Reitter, 1888)  (temperate Asia, North America, and Europe)
 Sinechostictus millerianus (Heyden, 1883)  (Europe)
 Sinechostictus moschatus (Peyron, 1858)  (temperate Asia, Europe, and North America)
 Sinechostictus multisulcatus (Reitter, 1890)  (temperate Asia and North America)
 Sinechostictus muyupingi Toledano, 2008  (China)
 Sinechostictus nakabusei (Jedlicka, 1958)  (temperate Asia)
 Sinechostictus nordmanni (Chaudoir, 1844)  (temperate Asia and North America)
 Sinechostictus pendleburyi (Andrewes, 1931)  (Indonesia and Borneo)
 Sinechostictus ruficornis (Sturm, 1825)  (Europe)
 Sinechostictus solarii (G.Müller, 1918)  (Europe)
 Sinechostictus stomoides (Dejean, 1831)  (Europe)
 Sinechostictus tarsicus (Peyron, 1858)  (Europe and temperate Asia)
 Sinechostictus wernermarggii Toledano, 2008  (China)

References

Trechinae